The Torysa is a river in eastern Slovakia. Its source is in the Levoča Mountains and it flows through the towns of: Lipany, Sabinov, Veľký Šariš, Prešov, and into the Hornád river near Nižná Hutka, southeast of Košice.

References

Rivers of Slovakia